The 1953 Kansas State Wildcats football team represented Kansas State University in the 1953 college football season.  The team's head football coach was Bill Meek.  The Wildcats played their home games in Memorial Stadium.  1953 saw the Wildcats finish with a record of 6–3–1, and a 4–2 record in Big Seven Conference play, tied for second in the conference.  The Wildcats scored 198 points while giving up 116.

Kansas State started the season with a 5–1 record, and made the program's first appearance in the top 20 of a national ranking system at #18 in the Coaches Poll on October 28.  1953 was also the first year that Kansas State played on national television, when its game on November 7 against rival Kansas was broadcast on NBC.

The team finished the season leading the NCAA in punt returns (23.8 yards per punt average).

Schedule

References

Kansas State
Kansas State Wildcats football seasons
Kansas State Wildcats football